Monkgate is a street in York, North Yorkshire running north-east from the city centre.

History
The street roughly follows the line of a Roman road from Eboracum to Derventio.  Its starting point was the Porta Principalis Sinistra of the Roman walls, now Monk Bar on the current York city walls.  The name "Monkgate" was first recorded in about 1075, named for monks attached to York Minster.  A Hospital of St Loy may have existed on the street, near Monk Bridge, but there was definitely a leper hospital there by 1380, and in 1396 a Maison Dieu was built, which survived until about 1610.

In the 12th-century, St Maurice's Church was constructed on the street.  The city's Jewish cemetery was also on the street.  The area became built up, but was devastated by the Siege of York in 1644, and all the current buildings are from after this date.  The Thomas Agar Hospital almshouse, built in 1631, appears to have survived the siege, but was demolished in 1879.

The York County Hospital was established on the street in 1740, and moved into a large building set back from the road in 1851.  In 1754, the Grey Coat School for girls was built, while from 1803 until 1840, Manchester College was based on the street, its buildings then becoming St John's College.  In the 18th- and 19th-centuries, the street was a prosperous residential area, with most buildings on the street dating from these centuries.  However, the area around it became increasingly industrial, and its prosperity declined.  St Maurice's Church was demolished in 1878, and a replaced demolished in 1967, although its cemetery survives.  The trees which once lined the street have largely been removed.  Despite this, the City of York Council claims that Monkgate has "retained its charm" and is "not as congested or noisy as some other city approaches".  Near Monk Bar, it has independent shops and other commercial uses, including a health centre and job centre, while it is more residential further out.

Layout and architecture

The street runs north-east from Monk Bar, continuing the line of Goodramgate.  It terminates at a roundabout at which it meets Heworth Green, Huntington Road, and Foss Bank, by Monk Bridge over the River Foss.  On the south-east side, it has junctions with St Maurice's Road, Agar Street, and Monkgate Cloisters, which leads to the former hospital.  On the north-west side, it meets Lord Mayor's Walk and Penley's Grove Street.

Notable buildings on the north-west side of the street include 19 and 21 Monkgate, built in 1812; 37 Monkgate, built in 1794 and extended in 1848; a Methodist church, built in 1903; St Wilfrid's School, built in 1875; 39 Monkgate, built in 1794; 55 Monkgate, built about 1810; and 63 and 65, 67 and 69, and 71-75 Monkgate, all built in the 1810s.  On the south-east side, buildings include the Bay Horse, built about 1820, with an ice house behind it; the 18th-century 24 Monkgate; 36 Monkgate, completed in 1798; the Grade II* listed Middleton House, built about 1700; the early-18th century 40 Monkgate; 42 Monkgate, built by George Hudson; an 18th-century malt kiln; and 44 Monkgate, built around 1723.

References

Streets in York
Odonyms referring to religion